Tomás Matias Santiago (born 15 June 1992) is an Argentine field hockey player who plays as a goalkeeper for Belgian Hockey League club La Gantoise and the Argentina national team.

Club career
Santiago started playing hockey at Córdoba Athletic and later emigrated to Buenos Aires and joined the ranks of Mitre. In 2017 he moved to Europe and started paying for La Gantoise in Belgium.

International career
He represented Argentina at the 2018 Men's Hockey World Cup.
And also he was reserve goalkeeper in the Olympic Games Rio 2016, where Argentine won the gold medal.
He was also reserve goalkeeper in the Panamerican Games in Toronto 2015 and reserve goalkeeper in Panamerican Games in Lima 2019.

References

External links

1992 births
Living people
Argentine expatriate sportspeople in Belgium
Argentine male field hockey players
Expatriate field hockey players
Male field hockey goalkeepers
Competitors at the 2018 South American Games
2018 Men's Hockey World Cup players
South American Games gold medalists for Argentina
South American Games medalists in field hockey
Men's Belgian Hockey League players
La Gantoise HC players
Place of birth missing (living people)
2023 Men's FIH Hockey World Cup players